Abdur Rahman Astrakhani was a Khan of Astrakhan from 1534 through 1538. For uncertainties and additional information see the second part of List of Astrakhan khans.

Khans of Astrakhan